The Walls and Gates of Peking is a book written by Osvald Sirén, originally published in English with a run of 800 copies by The Bodley Head in London in 1924.  It provides historical records of the walls and gates of Beijing and has 109 photos taken by Osvald Siren and 53 architectural drawings of gates made by Chinese artists.

References

External links
 https://archive.org/details/1924wallsgatespekingosvaldsiren
 

1924 non-fiction books
History of Beijing
Architecture books
John Lane (publisher) books